Angas (also Romanized as Angās; also known as Angāsh) is a village in Tavabe-e Kojur Rural District, Kojur District, Nowshahr County, Mazandaran Province, Iran. At the 2006 census, its population was 125, in 42 families.

This village is located 9 km south of Kojur District of Nowshahr city at 36 degrees and 15 minutes north latitude and 51 degrees and 45 minutes longitude from the Greenwich meridian.

Weather conditions 
This mountain village with an altitude of 1900 meters above sea level has a very cold climate in winter and cool and pleasant in summer.

Tourist Attractions
Jenab Waterfall
 Panjah Cham Waterfall
Cheshme Moozia Waterfall
 Owsiare Waterfall
 Boz Cheshme
 Cangelo Mountain(3600 m)
 Shah Kooh (2974 m)
 Dashton (2913 m)

References 

Populated places in Nowshahr County